List of communities in Hants County, Nova Scotia

Communities are ordered by the highway upon which they are located.  All routes start with the terminus located near the largest community.

Trunk Routes

Trunk 1: Hantsport - Mount Denson - Falmouth - Windsor - Three Mile Plains - Newport Station - St Croix - Newport Corner - Ardoise - Lakelands - Mount Uniacke 
Trunk 14: Vaughan - Smith's Corner - Windsor Forks - Ardoise - Sweet's Corner - Brooklyn - Woodville - Centre Rawdon - Rawdon Gold Mines - Upper Rawdon - Upper Nine Mile River - Nine Mile River - Hardwood Lands - Milford

Collector Roads

Route 202: Lakelands - Hillsvale - South Rawdon - Centre Rawdon - West Gore - Gore - East Gore
Route 214: Belnan
Route 215: Shubenacadie - Admiral Rock - Urbania - South Maitland - Maitland - Selma - Noel Shore - Densmore Mills - Noel - Minasville - Moose Brook - Tenecape - Walton - Pembroke - Cambridge - Bramber - Cheverie - Kempt Shore- Summerville - Centre Burlington - Brooklyn - Newport Corner
Route 236: Scotch Village - Riverside Corner - Stanley - Clarksville - Riverside Corner - Kennetcook - Upper Kennetcook - Five Mile River - Lattie's Brook - South Maitland
Route 354: Noel - Gormanville-  - North Noel Road-  - Noel Road-  - Kennetcook-  - Gore-  - Upper Rawdon-

Communities located on rural roads

Avondale
Barr Settlement
Belmont
Burtons
Cogmagun River
East Uniacke
Ellershouse
Five Mile Plains
Georgefield
Leminster
Maple Grove
McPhee's Corner
Micmac I.R. 14
Mosherville
Newport Landing
Northfield
Renfrew
South Uniacke
Stillwater
Three Mile Plains
Upper Falmouth
White Settlement

See also

Hants County

Geography of Hants County, Nova Scotia